Euphorbia squamosa is a species of plant in the family Euphorbiaceae. It is endemic to Iran, Russia, Georgia, Armenia, Azerbaijan, and Turkey.

References

squamosa
Flora of Iran
Flora of Russia
Flora of Georgia (country)
Flora of Armenia
Flora of Azerbaijan
Flora of Turkey